Alex Wexo (born March 16) is an American movie and television actor and producer. He is sometimes credited as Al Wexo. He is the founder of WexoFilms.

Life and career 
At age five he and his family moved to London, England, where he was raised. After graduating from high school at age seventeen, he moved to Edinburgh, Scotland where he resided for the next two years.

Wexo was introduced to director Rob Reiner, who cast him in the major motion picture A Few Good Men. Next, Wexo ventured into the television arena with guest starring roles in such hits as NYPD Blue and V.I.P.. Wexo’s first series was The Pretender appearing as "Young Sydney / Young Jacob " for the four-year duration of the network run. Going from one series to the next, he was mostly seen portraying "Conner" on the former hit show The Invisible Man. Since then Wexo has guest starred on numerous hit television shows such as The Mentalist, CSI, The Unit, Entourage and Dexter. He has a supporting role in Universal Pictures' Straight Outta Compton.

Wexo has trained with Stella Adler, Ellen Burstyn and Kim Stanley. He also attended the American Academy of Dramatic Arts. Wexo wrote, produced, directed and starred in his own series of short films. "The Wexo-One Act's" is the first in a series of films Wexo is producing and directing.

Wexo is a former United States Marine.

Filmography

Film
 A Few Good Men (1992, supporting) - Guard #2
 Buffalo Heart (1996, starring, also, precision driver) - Toby
 Volcano (1997) - Hard Rock Cafe Manager (uncredited)
 Ground Control (1998, starring role) - Flight 393 Pilot
 I am Singh (2011, starring role) - FBI Agent Kevin Johnson
 Straight Outta Compton (2015, supporting) - Officer
 20th Century Women (2016) - Julie's Stepdad
 Janelle Monáe: Dirty Computer (2018) - Scream Police
 Ford v Ferrari (2019) - Holman Moody Pit Crew
 Tenet (2020) - Military Veteran (uncredited)
 Tommy Hilfiger (starring role)
 "VICE" Secret Service Agent

Television
 Suspect Device (1995, TV Movie, starring role) - Male Cyborg #2
 The Pretender (1996-2000, series regular) - Young Sydney / Young Jacob / Young Sidney
 Welcome to Paradise (1997, TV Movie, starring role) - Delivery Van Driver
 V.I.P. (1999, guest star) - Roger Dintsman
 The Invisible Man (2001) - Connor
 CSI: Crime Scene Investigation (2005, guest star) - Stargazer
 Alias (2005, guest star) - US Marshal
 Nip/Tuck (2005, guest star) - EMT
 The Unit (2006, guest star) - Det. Humphrey
 Dexter (2006, guest star) - Male Detective #1
 Entourage (2007, guest star) - CIA Man
 Eleventh Hour (2008, guest star) - Sam Sheridan
 The Mentalist (2008, guest star) - Cop
 Bosch (2014, precision driver)

Theater

 A Streetcar Named Desire – Stanley
 The Streets of London –  Thompson
 Doctor & The Devils – Dr. Knox
 Hamlet – Ambassador/Sailor
 The Flight of the Earls – Michael Earl
 Hatful Of Rainbows'' – Johnny Pope

External links
 Official website
 

Year of birth missing (living people)
Living people
American male actors